Carboxylation is a chemical reaction in which a carboxylic acid is produced by treating a substrate with carbon dioxide. The opposite reaction is decarboxylation. In chemistry, the term carbonation is sometimes used synonymously with carboxylation, especially when applied to the reaction of carbanionic reagents with CO2. More generally, carbonation usually describes the production of carbonates.

Organic chemistry
Carboxylation is a standard conversion in organic chemistry. Specifically carbonation (i.e. carboxylation) of Grignard reagents and organolithium compounds is a classic way to convert organic halides into carboxylic acids.

Sodium salicylate, precursor to aspirin, is commercially prepared by treating sodium phenolate (the sodium salt of phenol) with carbon dioxide at high pressure (100 atm) and high temperature (390 K) – a method known as the Kolbe-Schmitt reaction. Acidification of the resulting salicylate salt gives salicylic acid.

Many detailed procedures are described in the journal Organic Syntheses.

Carboxylation catalysts include N-Heterocyclic carbenes  and catalysts based on silver.

Carboxylation in biochemistry
Carbon-based life originates from carboxylation that couples atmospheric carbon dioxide to a sugar.  The process is usually catalysed by the enzyme RuBisCO. Ribulose-1,5-bisphosphate carboxylase/oxygenase, the enzyme that catalyzes this carboxylation, is possibly the single most abundant protein on Earth.

Many carboxylases, including Acetyl-CoA carboxylase, Methylcrotonyl-CoA carboxylase, Propionyl-CoA carboxylase, and Pyruvate carboxylase require biotin as a cofactor. These enzymes are involved in various biogenic pathways. In the EC scheme, such carboxylases are classed under EC 6.3.4, "Other Carbon—Nitrogen Ligases".

Another example is the posttranslational modification of glutamate residues, to γ-carboxyglutamate, in proteins.  It occurs primarily in proteins involved in the blood clotting cascade, specifically factors II, VII, IX, and X, protein C, and protein S, and also in some bone proteins.  This modification is required for these proteins to function.  Carboxylation occurs in the liver and is performed by γ-glutamyl carboxylase (GGCX). GGCX requires vitamin K as a cofactor and performs the reaction in a processive manner.  γ-carboxyglutamate binds calcium, which is essential for its activity.  For example, in prothrombin, calcium binding allows the protein to associate with the plasma membrane in platelets, bringing it into close proximity with the proteins that cleave prothrombin to active thrombin after injury.

See also
 Decarboxylation

References 

Organic reactions
Post-translational modification